Fontanafredda (Standard Friulian: ;
Western Friulian:) is a comune (municipality) of about 12,000 inhabitants in Province of Pordenone, in Friuli-Venezia Giulia region, north-eastern Italy. The town hall is located in the frazione of Vigonovo.

Sports
A.S.D. Comunale Fontanafredda is the Italian football of the city. It was founded in 1925 as O.N.D. Fontanafredda and in 1940 was renamed Gil Fontanafredda, in 1945 Club della Fonte and in 1963 S.S. Fontanafredda. Currently it plays in Italy's Serie D after the promotion from Eccellenza Friuli-Venezia Giulia in the 2013–14 season.
 
Its home ground is Stadio Omero Tognon with 5,000 seats. The team's colors are red and black.

International relations

 
Fontanafredda is twinned with:
 Saint-Jean, France

People
Tino Petrelli

References

External links
 Official website

Cities and towns in Friuli-Venezia Giulia